Thackerville Public Schools is a PK-12 public school district based in the town of Thackerville, Oklahoma, United States.

In addition to Thackerville, the district also serves unincorporated areas in south-central Love County.

Thackerville's public schools are located on campus at the junction of U.S. Highway 77 and State Highway 153. Thackerville Elementary School serves students in grades Pre-Kindergarten through eight. Thackerville High School serves students in grades nine through twelve. 

School districts in Oklahoma
Education in Love County, Oklahoma